The 1895 Oklahoma Sooners football team represented University of Oklahoma as an independent during the 1895 college football season and was its first football team ever fielded by the school. The team completed its inaugural season with a 0–1 record.  The Sooners played their first football game in history against a team from Oklahoma City High School and lost by a final score of 34–0. This was the program's only season under the guidance of head coach John A. Harts, who later left the school to become a gold prospector.

Schedule

Roster

See also
 List of the first college football game in each US state

References

Oklahoma
Oklahoma Sooners football seasons
College football winless seasons
Oklahoma Sooners football